Tetrakis(triphenylphosphine)palladium(0) (sometimes called quatrotriphenylphosphine palladium) is the chemical compound [Pd(P(C6H5)3)4], often abbreviated Pd(PPh3)4, or rarely PdP4. It is a bright yellow crystalline solid that becomes brown upon decomposition in air.

Structure and properties
The four phosphorus atoms are at the corners of a tetrahedron surrounding the palladium(0) center. This structure is typical for four-coordinate 18 e− complexes.  The corresponding complexes Ni(PPh3)4 and Pt(PPh3)4 are also well known. Such complexes reversibly dissociate PPh3 ligands in solution, so reactions attributed to Pd(PPh3)4 often in fact arise from Pd(PPh3)3 or even Pd(PPh3)2.

Preparation
Tetrakis(triphenylphosphine)palladium(0) was first prepared by Lamberto Malatesta et al. in the 1950s by reduction of sodium chloropalladate with hydrazine in the presence of the phosphine. It is commercially available, but can be prepared in two steps from Pd(II) precursors:
PdCl2 + 2 PPh3 → PdCl2(PPh3)2
PdCl2(PPh3)2 + 2 PPh3 +  N2H4 → Pd(PPh3)4 +  N2 + 2 N2H5Cl
Both steps may be carried out in a one-pot reaction, without isolating and purifying the PdCl2(PPh3)2 intermediate. Reductants other than hydrazine can be employed. The compound is sensitive to air, but can be purified by washing with methanol to give the desired yellow powder. It is usually stored cold under argon.

Applications
Pd(PPh3)4 is widely used as a catalyst for palladium-catalyzed coupling reactions. Prominent applications include the Heck reaction, Suzuki coupling, Stille coupling, Sonogashira coupling, and Negishi coupling. These processes begin with two successive ligand dissociations followed by the oxidative addition of an aryl halide to the Pd(0) center:
Pd(PPh3)4 + ArBr → PdBr(Ar)(PPh3)2 + 2 PPh3

References

Palladium compounds
Reagents for organic chemistry
Triphenylphosphine complexes
Homogeneous catalysis